My Kind of Blues is the seventh studio album by American bluesman B.B. King. According to biographer David McGee, the songs were recorded in 1958 at the Chess Records studios in Chicago.  However, researcher Colin Escott identifies the recordings as being from a March 3, 1960 session, when King was under contract to the Bihari brothers and recorded in the Los Angeles area.

The Bihari's budget Crown Records issued the album in 1960. The liner notes contained a blurb about King's "particular form of jazz... blues-belter extraordinary" and little else. McGee notes that King is backed by a small combo composed of pianist Lloyd Glenn, bassist Ralph Hamilton, and drummer Jessie Sailes (most of King's recordings at the time included a horn section).

Three singles from the album were released by the Bihari's Kent Records; "Walkin' Mr. Bill" reached number 23 on Billboard's Hot R&B Sides chart in October 1960. In 2003, My Kind of Blues was reissued on CD by Ace Records with eight bonus tracks.

Critical reception

In a review for AllMusic, critic George Bedard rated the album three out of five stars and called it  "A masterpiece: a sparse, uncluttered sound with nothing to mask King's beautiful guitar and voice".
The Penguin Guide to Blues Recordings calls it “One of the great B.B. King albums”.

Track listing
The original Crown LP and many reissues do not list the songwriters, producers, nor running times. Details are taken from the AllMusic review and may differ from other sources.

References

Sources

1961 albums
B.B. King albums
Crown Records albums